Mountcastle is a suburb of Edinburgh, the capital of Scotland. It is east of the city centre and lies to the north-west of the neighbouring area of Portobello. Mountcastle is primarily a residential area, with many early-mid 20th century houses.

Sources
(Google Maps)

Areas of Edinburgh